Fedayeen Saddam was a paramilitary Fedayeen organization loyal to the Ba'athist Iraqi government of Saddam Hussein. The name was chosen to mean "Saddam's Men of Sacrifice". At its height, the group had 30,000–40,000 members. The Fedayeen operated completely outside the law, above and outside political and legal structures.

Irregular forces
The Fedayeen Saddam was not part of Iraq's regular armed forces but rather operated as a paramilitary unit of irregular forces. As a result of this, the Fedayeen reported directly to the Presidential Palace, rather than through the military chain of command. Whilst paramilitary the Fedayeen were not an elite military force, often receiving just basic training and operating without heavy weapons. In this they were somewhat similar to the Basij of Iran or Shabiha militia of Syria.

Much like other paramilitaries, the Fedayeen was volunteer based and the units were never given an official salary. As a result, most of the members resorted to extortion and theft of property from the general population, even though the members had access to sanction-evading trade and high quality services (i.e. new cars, hospitals reserved for officials, expensive electronics) and a general standard of living considerably higher than that of the average Iraqi of the time. However, they were ordered not to threaten or harm any government officials. As the group had no overt religious affiliations, it had a mix of Sunni and Shia members. 

The Fedayeen were among the most loyal organizations to the regime of Saddam Hussein and were a politically reliable force against domestic opponents. The militia is directly responsible for some of the regime’s most brutal acts. The Fedayeen caught the attention of the international community in 2000 when it was reported that 30 prostitutes were beheaded in Baghdad, Basra and other major cities. Their heads were left on the front doorsteps of the prostitutes' homes as a "deterrent". Another report revealed that the militia executed eight prisoners on charges of defacing several murals depicting Saddam Hussein. The Fedayeen played a role in the 2003 war, resisting the American-led invasion by conducting some of the most deadly attacks on U.S. forces, including suicide attacks.

History

Early years

Uday Hussein formed the Fedayeen Saddam in 1995 with ten to fifteen thousand recruits to maintain internal security in Iraq. The Fedayeen fighters tend to come from Saddam’s hometown of Tikrit or are recruited from his al-Bu Nasir tribe. Uday used the Fedayeen for personal reasons such as smuggling and suppressing opponents. Command of the militia was handed to Qusay Hussein in 1996 when it was uncovered that Uday was diverting weapons to the militia from the Iraqi Republican Guard.

Before Saddam was removed from power, the force was placed back under Uday's control. In 1998 the Ashbal Saddam (Saddam's Lion Cubs) was created to recruit and train young children for membership in the Fedayeen. The Ashbal recruited boys aged 10 to 15 for training in small arms and infantry tactics as well as loyalty conditioning.

2003 U.S. invasion
The Fedayeen Saddam did not rise to international attention, however, until the 2003 invasion of Iraq by U.S.-led Coalition forces. Whereas the Iraqi army and the Republican Guard quickly collapsed, Fedayeen forces put up stiff resistance to the coalition invasion. U.S. strategy was to bypass other cities and head straight to Baghdad. In response, Fedayeen fighters entrenched themselves in the cities and launched guerrilla-style attacks on rear supply convoys. These convoys were attempting but usually falling short of keeping up with the rapid advance to Baghdad. They were attempting to sustain the rapid advance by bringing up food, water, ammunition, medical supplies and mail from back home. These were very lightly armed cargo trucks driving as fast as they could on dirt roads mainly in southern Iraq, after loading supplies in Kuwait. Once they started to get close to central Iraq more and more paved roads were available. They were almost always at least a few days behind. This made the resupply convoys vulnerable to attack. In these trucks were usually low to mid ranking enlisted soldiers with mostly no combat experience before this. For instance these cargo trucks mainly were only defended by the two rifles the driver and truck commander had. So even with a relatively small force the Fedayeen could attack several of the last trucks in a convoy, or trucks that had lost contact with the convoy. It was easy for the Fedayeen to capture or destroy these isolated poorly defended vehicles. The Fedayeen also used intimidation in an attempt to maintain morale in the Iraqi army and to keep civilians from rebelling. The multinational coalition was forced to turn its attention to the slow task of rooting out irregular forces from the southern cities, delaying the advance by two weeks.  
During the invasion, Fedayeen fighters mostly wielded AK-47 assault rifles, rocket-propelled grenades, machine guns, and truck-mounted artillery and mortars. They made extensive use of subterfuge in an attempt to blunt the overwhelming technological advantage used by the invading forces.

By the end of the first week of April, Coalition forces had mostly succeeded in rooting out Fedayeen forces from the southern cities. The Shiite population was very un-supportive of the fighters, although many were intimidated. This factor, coupled with overwhelming firepower, quickly gave U.S. forces in the area a decisive edge. This reduced the pressure on the stretched supply lines, enabling the advance to continue. On April 9, Baghdad fell to U.S. forces with only sporadic resistance by Fedayeen irregulars, foreign volunteers, and remnants of the Special Republican Guard, effectively ending the regime of Saddam Hussein. Tikrit, the last city to fall, was taken on April 15. 

The Fedayeen Saddam was officially dissolved on May 23, 2003 per Order 2 of the Coalition Provisional Authority under Administrator Paul Bremer.

Iraqi insurgency

The fall of Baghdad effectively ended the existence of the Fedayeen Saddam as an organized paramilitary. Some of its members died during the war. A large number survived, however, and were willing to carry on the fight even after the fall of Saddam Hussein from power. Many former members joined guerrilla organizations, collectively known as the Iraqi insurgency, that began to form to resist the U.S-led occupation. By June, an insurgency was clearly underway in central and northern Iraq, especially in the area known as the Sunni Triangle. Some units of the Fedayeen also continued to operate independently of other insurgent organizations in the Sunni areas of Iraq. On November 30, 2003, a U.S. convoy traveling through the town of Samarra in the Sunni Triangle was ambushed by over 100 Iraqi guerrillas, reportedly wearing trademark Fedayeen Saddam uniforms. Exactly how much influence they had in the resistance, especially following Saddam Hussein's capture on December 13, 2003, was a source of controversy.

Additional roles
The Fedayeen has been cited as carrying out some of the most brutal acts of the pro-Saddam militias. Fedayeen Saddam committed torture and executions involving beatings, breaking bones, gouging out eyes, throwing people off of high buildings, chopping off fingers, ears and genitals, cutting out tongues, piercing hands with electric drills, ritualized mutilations and amputations. Additionally, they were thought to have acted as enforcers for the Iraqi army in order to prevent desertion. In the last two years of Hussein’s rule, a campaign of beheadings, mainly targeting women suspected of prostitution and carried out by his elite Fedayeen unit, killed more than 200 people, human rights groups reported at the time.

Appearance

The Fedayeen Saddam wore two uniforms, an all black one worn on operations and an all white one worn on parade. They also operated in plain clothes in order to confuse Coalition forces. 

A black Darth Vader style helmet was also worn by some of the black-uniformed Fedayeen, as Uday Hussein (commander of the Fedayeen and eldest son of Saddam) was reportedly an avid fan of Star Wars. The helmet shell was made of fibre glass, with a nylon webbing cradle. Fixed to the right side was a moulded rubber Fedayeen badge, which consisted of a silhouette of Saddam and the motto; Allah al-watan qa'ed (God, homeland, leader).

Equipment
The Fedayeen were equipped as light infantry, and were armed with AK-47/AKM assault rifles and RPGs.

See also
 "Blessed July"
 Popular Army (Iraq)

References

External links

 Federation of American Scientists on the Fedayeen Saddam
 "Saddam's Enforcers", Dan Rather, CBS's 60 Minutes
 "Fedayeen Enforces Loyalty Among Iraq Army" Washington Post, March 24, 2003

1995 establishments in Iraq
2003 disestablishments in Iraq
Ba'athist organizations
Factions in the Iraq War
Iraqi insurgency (2003–2011)
Organizations associated with the Ba'ath Party
Paramilitary forces of Iraq
Saddam Hussein